Don Gilberto Torres Núñez (August 23, 1915 – January 10, 1983) was a Cuban professional baseball player who appeared in 346 games in the Major Leagues for the  and – Washington Senators. He threw and batted right-handed.

Torres' professional career extended for 21 seasons (1935–1955), and he played almost 1,350 games in minor league baseball. His 320 MLB hits included 40 doubles and 11 triples.

He was the son of Ricardo Torres, a catcher and first baseman in professional baseball who played in 22 games for the Senators between 1920–1922.  Torres was first signed to a US professional contract with the Milwaukee Brewers of the American Association upon the recommendation of fellow Cuban player Joe Olivares.

See also
List of second-generation Major League Baseball players

Sources

1915 births
1983 deaths
Charlotte Hornets (baseball) players
Chattanooga Lookouts players
Diablos Rojos del México players
Havana Cubans players
Jersey City Giants players
Major League Baseball players from Cuba
Cuban expatriate baseball players in the United States
Major League Baseball infielders
Miami Sun Sox players
Milwaukee Brewers (AA) players
Montgomery Rebels players
Montreal Royals players
Sanford Lookouts players
Valdosta Dodgers players
Washington Senators (1901–1960) players
West Palm Beach Indians players
Baseball players from Havana